Ophiclinus gabrieli, the Frosted snake-blenny, is a species of clinid native to Amphibolis seagrass in the coastal waters of southern Australia.  It can reach a maximum length of  TL. The specific name honours the Australian pharmacist and conchologist Charles John Gabriel (1879-1963), the collector of the type.

References

gabrieli
Fish described in 1906
Taxa named by Edgar Ravenswood Waite